Dario Chistolini (born 14 September 1988 in Kempton Park, South Africa) is a South African-born Italian rugby union player. He currently plays for Petrarca Padova in the Italian domestic league Top10. He plays as a prop.

Dario joined Gloucester for the start of the 2011–12 season. He joined from Petrarca.
On 6 April 2013, Chistolini will leave Gloucester to return home to Italy to join the new franchise Zebre for 2013/14 season.

He previously played for Italy A. Chistolini was selected for Italy for the 2014 mid-year Test series. He made his debut, as a replacement from the bench, losing to Samoa 15–0 on 14 June 2014.

References

External links
Gloucester Rugby profile

Living people
1988 births
South African rugby union players
Italian rugby union players
Italy international rugby union players
Gloucester Rugby players
Zebre Parma players
Rugby union props
South African expatriate rugby union players
Expatriate rugby union players in England
South African expatriate sportspeople in England
South African people of Italian descent
People from Kempton Park, Gauteng
Rugby union players from Gauteng
Valorugby Emilia players